Homopholis fasciata, a nocturnal vertebrate known as the banded velvet gecko or striped velvet gecko, is a small gecko that lives in East Africa.

Description
Homopholis Fasciata's are small gecko's with soft, velvet-like skin. They have short, rounded heads and long, thin non-tapering tails. Their body shape is stout with a bunt and toes that have both adhesive pads and claws. Their skin ranges from green, greys and browns with a chevron-like pattern down the back. They grow to 3½" - 4½" and are known to bite.

Homopholis Fasciatas are from Tropical East Africa.  They inhabit wet or dry savannas containing large trees. They can be found hiding under the bark and in the crevasses of these trees. Mostly nocturnal but may also be found active during the day.

In captivity

Captive environment 
In captivity, they require many hiding spots and 80–90 °F heating by means of a heat mat. The optimal temperature should be 75° to 82 °F daytime with a 5° to 10 °F drop at night. A daytime hot spot is beneficial; using a 10 or 20 watt halogen light works well. These geckos requires moderate to high humidity, 60 to 80%, with a gradient between one side of the enclosure and the other. This can be accomplished well by keeping the side where the water dish is located a bit cooler and spraying that area down daily. As for lighting, use plant grow lights on a timer to simulate the tropics, 12 hours on, 12 hours off. Seasonal day length fluctuations are not needed but could help to stimulate breeding. A dim night light is required for viewing nocturnal activities. A 10-gallon will work for a pair but a taller tank would be better. Set it up as forest habitat with climbing branches, sturdy plants, hiding places and a warm area or basking spot.

Feeding
Small crickets are the main staple diet along with small mealworms and various other insects when available. Excess calcium causes their neck pouches to puff out.

Husbandry
In terms of mating, males have hemipenal bulges at the base of the tail. Males also have a pair of pre-anal pores/scales just above the cloacal opening that the females lack. Egg laying may occur during the winter in the Northern Hemisphere. 4 or 5 clutches of 2 eggs each may be laid during the breeding period. The hard-shelled eggs are laid under loose bark, in crevasses or buried in a slightly moist spot. They should be removed for incubation at around 82 °F.

References

External links
http://www.petlifeforms.com/geckovelv.htm
https://animaldiversity.org/accounts/Homopholis_fasciata/classification/

Homopholis
Reptiles of Ethiopia
Reptiles of Kenya
Reptiles of Somalia
Reptiles of Tanzania
Taxa named by George Albert Boulenger
Reptiles described in 1890